Button Creek is a river in Madison County in New York. It flows into Unadilla River south of Leonardsville.

References

Rivers of New York (state)
Rivers of Madison County, New York